This is a list of current and former Roman Catholic churches in the Roman Catholic Diocese of Cleveland. The diocese covers Ashland, Cuyahoga, Geauga, Lake, Lorain, Medina, Summit and Wayne in northeastern Ohio. The cathedral church of the diocese is the Cathedral of St. John the Evangelist in Cleveland.

Cleveland

Akron

Other areas

References

 
Cleveland